Alessandro Solbiati (born 9 September 1956) is an Italian composer of classical music, who composed instrumental music for chamber ensembles and orchestra, art songs and operas. He received international commissions and awards, and many of his works are recorded. He is also an academic, teaching in Italy and France.

Career 
Born on 9 September 1956 in Busto Arsizio, Solbiati studied music at the Milan Conservatory, piano with Eli Perrota, and composition with Sandro Gorli. He finished both subjects with diplomas. He studied further, from 1977 to 1980, at the Accademia Chigiana di Siena with Franco Donatoni.

He received commissions from La Scala, the RAI, Radio France, Mozarteum, Gulbenkian Foundation and Southbank Centre, among others. His music has been performed at notable festivals, in Australia, Austria, Croatia, France, Germany, Greece, Japan, Netherlands, Portugal, Russia, Spain, Sweden, Switzerland, the UK and the US, and other. His music has been broadcast in Europe and America. It was published by "Edizioni Suvini Zerboni" in Milan.

He set poems by Baudelaire, Rainer Maria Rilke and Friedrich Hölderlin to music, among others. Two operas are based on works by Russian authors, Il carro e i canti (2008) after Alexander Pushkin, and Leggenda after Dostoyevsky's The Brothers Karamazov. It was commissioned by the Teatro Regio di Torino and premiered in 2011, conducted by Gianandrea Noseda. His third opera, Il suono giallo, is based on Wassily Kandinsky's experimental play The Yellow Sound. It was premiered on 13 June 2015 at the Teatro Comunale di Bologna.

Solbiati has taught composition at the Conservatorio Giovanni Battista Martini of Bologna, the Milan Conservatory and the Centre Acanthes in Avignon. He has held master classes at the Conservatoire de Paris and the Conservatoire de Lyon.

His compositions achieved awards at international competitions, such as a string quartet at the International Milan Competition in 1980, and a violin concerto, Di Luce, winning the RAI-Paganini Prize of Rome in 1982.

Compositions 
His list of compositions is published by IRCAM:

 ibi bonae fabbricator for flute
 Quartetto for string quartet (1980)
 Des ciels brouillés for oboe and ensemble (1981)
 Blütenstaub for violin, viola and piano (1982)
 Di luce for violin and orchestra (1982)
 Cadeau for  piano, violin, cello and five percussionist (1984)
 Lied for soprano, violin, cello and piano (1985)
 Nel deserto oratorio for soloists, choir and instruments (1986)
 Dawn for flute and harp (1987)
 Trio for violin, cello and piano (1987)
 Notturno for wind quintet (1988)
 As if to land for flute (1989)
 Am Fuss des Gebirgs for flute, bass clarinet and piano (1991)
 Corde for viola (1991)
 Secondo quartetto for string quartet (1991)
 Decima elegia for soloists, choir and orchestra (1991/95)
 Canto per Ania for cello and 14 instruments (1992)
 Ottetto for wind instruments (1992)
 By my window for piano and ensemble (1993)
 Mi lirica sombra for bass clarinet and ensemble (1993)
 Con l'antico canto for flute and bass clarinet (1995)
 Inno, radio opera (1996)
 La colomba azzurra / racconto in musica su testo di Paola Capriolo (1996)
 Mari for flute, clarinet, violin, cello and piano (1997)
 Sonetto for violin and piano (1997)
 Sinfonia for orchestra (1997/98)
 Piccoli canti / per voce recitante e otto strumenti su testi di Alda Merini (1998)
 Ingresso e Kyrie for choir and instruments (1999)
 Sette pezzi for string orchestra (1999)
 Concerto for guitar and orchestra (2000)
 Der Wind spielt for wind instruments (2002)
 Memoriam for orchestra (2002)
 Piccoli canti Suite for eight instruments (2002)
 Due adagi for violin solo (2003)
 Il risveglio di Florestano for chamber orchestra (2003)
 Pensieri interrotti for bayan (2003)
 Weg for twelve instruments (2004)
 Sonata seconda for piano (2005)
 Alumina for flute and strings (2005)
 Volo for soprano and viola (2005)
 Dies for clarinet and piano (2005)
 Sonata Felix for piano and violin (2006)
 Tre lieder su George for soprano and piano on poems by Stefan George (2006)
 Und nun for baritone and seven instrumenti. Homage to Joseph Haydn on a stanza by Rainer Maria Rilke (2009)
 Thai song for 52 gongs from Thailand (2009)
 Il carro e i canti, opera in one act, after Pushkin (2009)
 Leggenda, opera in one act, libretto by the composer (2011)
 Il suono giallo, opera (2017)

Recordings 
 Nel Deserto, ensemble 2E2M (CD ADDA)
 Quartetto con lied, Borciani string quartet (Stradivarius)
 Trio, trio Matisse (Ermitage)
 Tre pezzi per chitarra, Filomena Moretti (Phoenix)
 Alessandro Solbiati ensemble Alternance (Stradivarius)
 Crescendo, orchestra (EMA Vinci records)
 Il suono giallo, Opera (EMA Vinci records – EMA Vinci contemporanea)
 Leggenda, Opera (EMA Vinci records – EMA Vinci contemporanea)
 INSIEME, ensemble (EMA VInci records – EMA Vinci contemporanea)

References

External links 
 Profile, Edizioni Suvini Zerboni (in Italian)
 
 "Intervista con Alessandro Solbiati su Trittico per fisarmonica da concerto", [interview with Alessandro Solbiati on "Trittico for accordion"] by Corrado Rojac and Lidia Bramani, 25 May 2015, Corrado strumentiemusica.com (in Italian)

1956 births
Living people
People from Busto Arsizio
Italian composers
Milan Conservatory alumni
Academic staff of the Conservatorio Giovanni Battista Martini
Academic staff of Milan Conservatory